Events from the year 1970 in Scotland.

Incumbents 

 Secretary of State for Scotland and Keeper of the Great Seal – Willie Ross until 20 June; then Gordon Campbell

Law officers 
 Lord Advocate – Henry Wilson; then Norman Wylie
 Solicitor General for Scotland – Ewan Stewart until June; then David Brand

Judiciary 
 Lord President of the Court of Session and Lord Justice General – Lord Clyde
 Lord Justice Clerk – Lord Grant
 Chairman of the Scottish Land Court – Lord Birsay

Events 
 21 January – Fraserburgh lifeboat Duchess of Kent, on service to the Danish fishing vessel Opal, capsizes with the loss of five of the six crew members.
 19 March – The South Ayrshire by-election is held. Jim Sillars retains the seat for the Labour Party.
 24 May – The Greek Orthodox Cathedral of St Luke in Glasgow is raised to this status.
 18 June – The 1970 general election is held. Labour wins a majority in Scotland with 48 out of the 71 seats available, but the Conservative Party wins a majority across the UK, and Edward Heath replaces Harold Wilson as Prime Minister. The Scottish National Party wins its first MP elected at a general election (Donald Stewart in the Western Isles) but Winnie Ewing loses the Hamilton seat; leaving the SNP with only a single seat.
 26 June – The Kingston Bridge, Glasgow opens. 
 16 – 25 July: the 1970 British Commonwealth Games are held in Edinburgh.
 26 July – 1 August – the 1970 Commonwealth Paraplegic Games are held in Edinburgh.
 7 October – BP announces the discovery of the massive Forties Oil Field in Scottish waters.
 Hepatitis B outbreak in Edinburgh.
 Blair Drummond Safari Park opens.

Births 

 14 February – Paul Rutherford, powerlifter
 16 April – James Watson, actor
 10 May – David Weir, international footballer
 4 July – Doddie Weir, rugby union player (died 2022)
 19 July – Nicola Sturgeon, SNP politician, First Minister of Scotland (2014– ; Deputy from 2007)
 21 July – Angus MacNeil, SNP politician
 12 August – Alan Brown, SNP politician
 21 August – David Hopkin, footballer
 22 July – Doug Johnstone, crime fiction writer, rock musician and physicist
 17 September – Dallas Campbell, television presenter
 6 December – Lewis MacLeod, voice actor
 17 December – Stella Tennant, model (died 2020)
 23 December – Karine Polwart, singer-songwriter

Deaths 
 25 May – Tom Patey, mountaineer (born 1932), died in climbing accident
 13 June – John Nicholson, footballer (born 1888)

See also 
 1970 in Northern Ireland
 1970 in Wales

References 

 
Scotland
Years of the 20th century in Scotland
1970s in Scotland